This is a list of the European Hot 100 Singles and European Top 100 Albums number ones of 2010, as published by Billboard magazine.

Chart history

References

2010 in Europe
Europe
2010
2010